The Mississauga Chiefs were a professional women's ice hockey team that played in the Canadian National Women's Hockey League (NWHL) and the Canadian Women's Hockey League (CWHL). They played in Mississauga, Ontario at the Hershey Centre and the Iceland Mississauga in the Greater Toronto Area. Founded as the Mississauga Chiefs in 1993, the team was known as the Mississauga Ice Bears during 2000 to 2003 and as the Oakville Ice during 2003 to 2007.

History
The Mississauga Chiefs were founded in 1993 in the Central Ontario Women's Hockey League (COWHL) where they played for five seasons. In 1998, the COWHL was reorganized and became the National Women's Hockey League (NWHL). The team changed their name to Mississauga Ice Bears from 2000 to 2003 and the Oakville Ice from 2003 to 2007. In 2007–08, the NWHL disbanded and the clubs were re-organized to join the Canadian Women's Hockey League (CWHL). As part of the new league, the Oakville Ice merged with the Mississauga Aeros to re-affiliate with the Chiefs' hockey organization to become the Mississauga Chiefs again. In 2008, they were the CWHL championship runner-up to the Brampton Thunder. The Chiefs participated in the 2010 Clarkson Cup. In 2010–11, the CWHL was restructured and reduced the number of its teams to five, eliminating the Mississauga Chiefs and two other teams, and created a new Toronto team that acquired several former Chiefs players including Jennifer Botterill and Sami Jo Small.

The Chiefs' name continued to be used by the organization for their Mississauga Jr. Chiefs and youth girls' programs.

Season-by-season

Source:

Clarkson Cup 2010
2010 Clarkson Cup semifinals

Former staff
General manager: Jim Holman
Assistant general manager:  Lori Friesen
Head coach: Rick Osborne
Assistant coaches: Bruce Rose and Bill Campbell

Notable players
Jennifer Botterill
Cherie Piper
Cheryl Pounder
Sami Jo Small

Awards and honours
Jennifer Botterill, Angela James Bowl (2008)
Jennifer Botterill, Central Division All-Star (2008)
Jennifer Botterill, CWHL Top Forward (2008)

References

External links
 Mississauga Chiefs Website
 Oakville Ice website
  Oakville Ice Alumni

Women's ice hockey teams in Canada
Defunct ice hockey teams in Canada
Ice hockey teams in Ontario
Canadian Women's Hockey League teams
Women in Ontario
1993 establishments in Ontario
2010 disestablishments in Ontario
Ice hockey clubs established in 1993
Sport in Mississauga
Ice hockey clubs disestablished in 2010